The Chanderi Inscription of Alā al-Dīn Khaljī is an epigraphic record in four lines, written in Naskh script in the Persian language. It records the completion of a mosque during the governorship of Amīr al-Umarā', Ikhtiyār al-Dawla wa al-Dīn Tamur Sulṭānī by Ismā‘īl, son of ‘Abd al-Salām, entitled Wajīh-i Najīb, the muḥarrir of the district (khiṭṭa) of Kol (Aligarh) during the reign of ‘Alā' al-Dunyā wa al-Dīn Abu al-Muẓaffar Muḥammad Shāh (i.e. ‘Alā' al-Dīn Khaljī, popularly known as Alauddin Khalji, d. 1316 AD).

Date and importance
The inscription is dated 711 in the Hijra era, sha‘bān 20. It is accordingly said to be the oldest known Islamic inscription from Chanderi. The date corresponds to  Friday 31 December 1311 C.E.

Publication
The inscription was first mentioned in 1924-25 by M. B. Garde in the annual reports of the Gwalior State archaeological department. Later it was published in Indian Historical Quarterly, and listed in the Annual Report on Indian Epigraphy. An edition appeared in the 1968 volume of Epigraphia Indica, Persian and Arabic Supplement. The inscription was later listed in a volume by M. Willis.

Location
The inscription, lost for a number of years, was located by Muzaffar Ansari who donated it to the Archaeological Museum, Chanderi, where it is registered under the number AMC 97/98. The museum is under the supervision of the Archaeological Survey of India.

References

Further reading 
 

14th-century inscriptions
Indian inscriptions
Indo-Islamic inscriptions
History of Madhya Pradesh
Alauddin Khalji